The European Tour is a men's professional golf tour based in Europe.

European Tour may also refer to:

Sport
Ladies European Tour, a women's professional golf tour based in Europe
European Tour (snooker), a series of snooker tournaments, part of the Players Tour Championship
PDC European Tour, a series of darts tournaments

Entertainment

Music
The European Tour, an album by jazz musician John Coltrane

Video games
PGA European Tour (video game), a golf game, part of the PGA Tour series